Giovanni Battista Treviso (fl. 1650s) was an Italian composer and maestro di capella in Pavia.

Recordings
Gaudete omnes on Fabellae Sacrae. Savadi. 2008

References

17th-century Italian composers
Italian male composers
17th-century male musicians